Woodville is a city in Greene County, Georgia, United States. The population was 321 at the 2010 census, down from 400 at the 2000 census.

History
According to tradition Woodville was so named from the fact it was a shipping point of wood. The Georgia General Assembly incorporated Woodville as a city in 1911.

Geography

Demographics

As of the census of 2000, there were 400 people, 136 households, and 99 families residing in the city. The racial makeup of the city was 29.50% White, 69.50% African American, 0.75% Native American and 0.25% Asian. Hispanic or Latino of any race were 1.50% of the population.

There were 136 households, out of which 29.4% had children under the age of 18 living with them, 41.9% were married couples living together, 26.5% had a female householder with no husband present, and 27.2% were non-families. 22.8% of all households were made up of individuals, and 11.8% had someone living alone who was 65 years of age or older.  The average household size was 2.94 and the average family size was 3.43.

In the city, the population was spread out, with 30.3% under the age of 18, 7.8% from 18 to 24, 23.8% from 25 to 44, 27.0% from 45 to 64, and 11.3% who were 65 years of age or older.  The median age was 36 years. For every 100 females, there were 86.9 males.  For every 100 females age 18 and over, there were 88.5 males.

The median income for a household in the city was $31,667, and the median income for a family was $34,219. Males had a median income of $25,568 versus $22,500 for females. The per capita income for the city was $14,550.  About 19.4% of families and 28.1% of the population were below the poverty line, including 40.6% of those under age 18 and 9.3% of those age 65 or over.

Notable person
Woodville was home to Major Robert McWhorter (CSA) who represented Greene County in the Georgia General Assembly for most of the period 1847–1884. McWhorter is noted as being the first Republican Speaker of the Georgia House of Representatives (1868-1870) under the Reconstruction era government. McWhorter is buried in Woodville Cemetery.

References

Cities in Georgia (U.S. state)
Cities in Greene County, Georgia